OJM Black Country Rangers Football Club is a football club based in Lye, West Midlands, England.

History
The club was established in 1996. In 2007 they joined Division Two of the West Midlands (Regional) League. The club were Division Two champions in 2009–10, earning promotion to Division One. They were Division One champions the following season and were promoted to the Premier Division.

Black Country Rangers' first season in the Premier Division saw them finish as runners-up. The club also won the JW Hunt Cup, beating AFC Wulfrunians 4–3 in the final. They retained the cup the following season with a 4–3 win over Wolverhampton Casuals. In 2018 the club was restructured and renamed Black Country Football Club, although the first team continued to play under the name Black Country Rangers.

At the end of the 2020–21 season Black Country Rangers were transferred to Division One of the Midland League when the Premier Division of the West Midlands (Regional) League lost its status as a step six division.

Honours
West Midlands (Regional) League
Division One champions 2010–11
Division Two champions 2009–10
JW Hunt Cup
Winners 2011–12, 2012–13

Records
Best FA Cup performance: Preliminary round, 2013–14
Best FA Vase performance: Second round, 2012–13

References

Football clubs in England
Football clubs in the West Midlands (county)
Sport in Sandwell
1996 establishments in England
Association football clubs established in 1996
West Midlands (Regional) League
Rowley Regis
Midland Football League